Piz Canfinal is a mountain of the Bernina Range (Alps), located on the border between Italy and Switzerland. It lies between the Val Malenco and the Val Poschiavo, north of the Corno Campascio.

References

External links
 Piz Canfinal on Hikr

Bernina Range
Mountains of Graubünden
Mountains of Lombardy
Mountains of the Alps
International mountains of Europe
Italy–Switzerland border
Mountains of Switzerland
Poschiavo

nn:Corno Campascio